Indonesian Americans are migrants from the multiethnic country of Indonesia to the United States, and their U.S.-born descendants. In both the 2000 and 2010 United States census, they were the 15th largest group of Asian Americans recorded in the United States as well as one of the fastest growing.

History

Overview
The earliest Indonesian immigrants to the United States were Dutch Indonesian or "Indos" who settled in Southern California in the 1950s as refugees following the Indonesian National Revolution against Dutch Colonists. Indonesian international students came to the United States in significant numbers as early as the mid-1950s, beginning with a 1953 International Cooperation Administration (now U.S. Agency for International Development) program to allow University of Indonesia medical faculty to pursue higher studies at the University of California, Berkeley. Permanent settlement in the U.S. began to grow in 1965, due to the Immigration and Nationality Act of 1965, which opened the door to Asian immigration, and the violent and chaotic Transition to the New Order in Indonesia, which spurred emigration from that country. Due to the 1997 Asian financial crisis, between 1980 and 1990, the number of Indonesians in the United States tripled, reaching 30,085. A large proportion live in Southern California: 29,710 respondents to the 2000 census who listed "Indonesian" as one of their ethnicities lived there. Indonesia was one of 25 other countries that participated in a special registration program for its emigrants which started in 2002 as a response to the September 11 attacks against the US. Following the 2004 tsunami in the Indian Ocean, there was another surge of immigrants to the East Coast of the US which included many Indonesians.

Between 2000 and 2010, the number of census respondents identifying themselves as Indonesian (either alone or in combination with other responses) grew by 51% from 63,073 to 95,270. Come 2015, this number has augmented again to 113,000 persons according to the Pew Research Center.

Chinese Indonesian asylum seekers
Active lobbying of politicians by Chinese American groups contributed to an unusually high number of successful Chinese Indonesian applicants for political asylum to the United States in 1998 as an impact of the May 1998 riots in Indonesia. According to the U.S. Department of Justice, 7,359 applicants were granted asylee status and 5,848 were denied in the decade up to 2007. In recent years, however, it has become increasingly difficult for applicants to prove to immigration officials that they would face targeted violence if returned to Indonesia.

In 2004, the U.S. Court of Appeals for the Ninth Circuit ruled in Sael v. Ashcroft that a Chinese Indonesian couple was eligible for political asylum after citing the existence of anti-Chinese violence and of laws that prohibit Chinese schools and institutions. The same court in the following year granted Marjorie Lolong eligibility for asylum after finding that she is "a member of [women and Christian] sub-groups that are at a substantially greater risk of persecution than the [ethnic Chinese] group as a whole." However, the court reversed its findings through an en banc decision and stated that it understood the Board of Immigration Appeals' (BIA) "decision to preclude a general grant of asylum to Indonesian Chinese Christians." The dissenting opinion criticized the BIA's rejection of testimony regarding the Indonesian government's inability to control persecution despite its intentions.

Demography
According to estimates from the American Community Survey for 2015–2019, the total population of Indonesian immigrants in the USA was 96,200. Of that number, the top 15 counties of residence were:

1) Los Angeles County, California - 13,800

2) San Bernardino County, California - 4,800

3) Orange County, California - 4,600

4) Queens County, New York - 2,700

5) Alameda County, California - 2,700

6) Santa Clara County, California - 2,500

7) Harris County, Texas -  2,500

8) Philadelphia County, Pennsylvania - 2,000

9) King County, Washington - 1,900

10) San Diego County, California - 1,800

11) Riverside County, California - 1,600

12) Contra Costa County, California - 1,400

13) Snohomish County, Washington - 1,300

14) San Francisco County, California - 1,300

15) Maricopa County, Arizona - 1,300

Ethnicity
Indonesian Americans are members of various ethnic subcategories such as the Minahasans, Javanese, Batak, or Tionghoa. The first Indonesians to move to Southern California were Indos (Indonesians of mixed Native Indonesian and European descent). However, the majority of Indonesians who came in the 1960s were of Chinese descent. Unofficial estimates suggest that as many as 60% of the Indonesians in Southern California are of Chinese descent. Interracial marriage is not uncommon, especially among the young, though the elderly often prefer that their children marry other Indonesian or Chinese.

Many second-generation Indonesian Americans still feel a connection to their Indonesian identity through their ancestry despite often not having a complete grasp on the Indonesian language.

Religion
Indonesian Americans belong to many faiths including Islam, Protestantism, Catholicism, Confucianism, Buddhism and Hinduism, although the first three are the most common.

While Islam gains its popularity among Indonesian Americans due to Indonesia being one of the largest Islamic countries in the world, Christianity is the mostly rapidly growing religious tradition among these communities. The first Indonesian church in the U.S. was a Seventh-day Adventist Church established in Glendale, California in 1972 with a predominantly Indo congregation (now located in Azusa, CA); however, as more pribumi migrants joined the church, racial tensions arose, and the Indos withdrew to other churches. The second Indonesian church to be founded in the U.S. was a Baptist church, started by an ethnic Chinese pastor and with a predominantly ethnic Chinese congregation. By 1988, there were 14 Indonesian Protestant congregations; ten years later, that number had grown to 41, with two Indonesian Catholic congregations as well. Catholicism is most present within Indonesian American communities in states like California, Georgia, New Jersey, or Pennsylvania where mass is offered weekly or monthly in the Indonesian language. Many of the Chinese-Indonesian immigrants of the late 1990s were Christian, and chose to flee their mainland due to fear of persecution.

Indonesian Muslims constituted around 15% of the Indonesian American population in the 1990s. The first Indonesian Mosque in the US was the Al-Hikmah Mosque founded in Astoria, New York, which is currently headed by Shamsi Ali. In 2017, the Indonesian Muslim community in Los Angeles purchased a former church at 1200 Kenmore Avenue and converted it into At-Thohir Mosque. There is also an Indonesian mosque in Silver Spring, Maryland named the IMAAM Center. This mosque is very active today through its regular services and community outreach, as it is an important hub for Indonesian Muslim life in America. Many upper class Indonesians have chosen to assimilate more into American culture due to economic and cultural comforts. From the perspective of those within this community, this can be seen as a divergence from the Indonesian Muslim identity.

Workforce 
Roughly one of every eight Indonesian Americans worked as a cook, waiter, or waitress. Restaurants owned by Indonesian Americans are sites for cultural unity over shared meals and traditions.

Media
Indonesians have founded a number of publications in California. The earliest was the Indonesian Journal, founded in 1988, and published primarily in the Indonesian language. Others include the Loma Linda-based Actual Indonesia News (founded 1996, also in Indonesian), and the Glendora-based Indonesia Media (founded 1998). Los Angeles-based monthly The Indonesia Letter has the largest circulation.

Notable people

Arts and entertainment
 Joey Alexander, pianist
 Sutan Amrull, drag performer
 Lulu Antariksa, actress and singer
 Carmit Bachar, member of The Pussycat Dolls, singer, dancer, and actress 
 Michelle Branch, Grammy-winning singer and songwriter
 Mark-Paul Gosselaar, actor, mother is Dutch-Indonesian
 Cynthia Gouw, actress, TV news anchor and host who was named Miss Chinatown USA 1984
 Tania Gunadi, Indonesian-born Hollywood actress
 Steven Ho, martial artist and actor
 Coco Lee, international artist, Hong Kong-based singer, actress, and songwriter (father is an ethnic Chinese from Indonesia while mother is from Hong Kong, China)
 Rory Leidelmeyer, bodybuilder and stuntman
 Innosanto Nagara, author, illustrator
 Irma Pane, pop singer
 Jodi Ann Paterson, model
 Rich Brian, rapper, singer, songwriter, record producer
 Niki, singer, songwriter
 Yoshi Sudarso, actor, stuntman
 Alex Van Halen, member of rock group Van Halen, mother was Dutch-Indonesian
 Eddie Van Halen, member of rock group Van Halen, mother was Dutch-Indonesian
 Wolfgang Van Halen
 Armand van Helden, American DJ, record producer, remixer and songwriter
 Stephanie Poetri, singer-songwriter
 Dallas Liu, actor
 Warren Hue, rapper

Business and technology
 Julia S. Gouw, President of East West Bancorp
 Theresia Gouw, Investor/Venture Capitalist
 Leo Koguan, Chairman and co-founder, SHI International
 Sehat Sutardja, Co-Founder of Marvell Technology Group
 Pantas Sutardja, Co-Founder of Marvell Technology Group
 Tonny Soesanto, CEO and Founder of Kikka Sushi
 Hans Gunawan, VP Finance of Roblox
 Eric Tjahjadi, VP, Head of Global Ad Sales at Sony Music

Criminal
 Rudy Kurniawan, criminal and perpetrator of wine fraud.

Literature and media
 Li-Young Lee, American poet; of ethnic Chinese origin, born in Indonesia
 Rahadyan Sastrowardoyo, writer, editor, and photographer
 Shamsi Ali

Politics
 Maya Soetoro-Ng, half-sister of former United States president Barack Obama
 Joyce L. Kennard, former Associate Justice of the Supreme Court of California
 Marissa Hutabarat, District Court Judge in New Orleans
 Andrew Lie, school board president for Jefferson Union High School District, California

Science
 Willem Jacob Luyten, astronomer

Sports
 Arki Dikania Wisnu, basketball player
 Rudy Gunawan, world champion badminton player
 Tony Gunawan, world champion, Olympic gold medalist, and badminton player
 Halim Haryanto, All England, world champion badminton player
 John Juanda, professional poker player
 Chris Limahelu, American football player
 Kyle Winter, rugby union player
 Gavin Kwan Adsit, footballer

See also

 Permias
 Indonesia–United States relations

References

Sources
  pp 515–566.
 
 
Budiman, Abby. "Indonesians in the U.S. Fact Sheet." Pew Research Center. 2021. online
Yang, Eveline. "Indonesian Americans." Gale Encyclopedia of Multicultural America, edited by Thomas Riggs, 3rd ed., vol. 2, Gale, 2014P, pp. 401–411. online

Further reading

External links
 Indonesian American Association – Ikatan Keluarga Indonesia
 US Census 2000 foreign born population by country
 daftar Gereja-gereja bahasa Indonesia di Amerika
 Jembatan Informasi Indonesia-Amerika
 Media Indonesia-Amerika

Asian-American society
Southeast Asian American
 
 
United States